Lennart Moser (born 6 December 1999) is a German professional footballer who plays as a goalkeeper for Belgian club Eupen.

Career
Having previously been loaned out to Regionalliga Nordost club Energie Cottbus and Belgian First Division A club Cercle Brugge from Union Berlin, Moser joined 2. Liga side Austria Klagenfurt on loan for the second half the 2020–21 season.

On 18 June 2022, Moser returned to Belgium and signed a three-year contract with Eupen.

Career statistics

Club

Notes

References

1999 births
Living people
German footballers
German expatriate footballers
Association football goalkeepers
Regionalliga players
Belgian Pro League players
2. Liga (Austria) players
Austrian Football Bundesliga players
1. FC Union Berlin players
FC Energie Cottbus players
Cercle Brugge K.S.V. players
SK Austria Klagenfurt players
K.A.S. Eupen players
German expatriate sportspeople in Belgium
Expatriate footballers in Belgium
German expatriate sportspeople in Austria
Expatriate footballers in Austria
Footballers from Berlin